The Shire of Bet Bet was a local government area located about  northwest of Melbourne, the state capital of Victoria, Australia.

History

Bet Bet was first incorporated as a road district on 18 January 1861, and became a shire on 20 September 1864.

On 20 January 1995, the Shire of Bet Bet was abolished, and along with the City of Maryborough, the Shire of Tullaroop and a number of surrounding districts, was merged into the newly created Shire of Central Goldfields. The Tarnagulla district was transferred to the newly created Shire of Loddon.

Wards

The Shire of Bet Bet was divided into three ridings on 31 May 1988, each of which elected three councillors:
 Bealiba Riding
 Dunolly Riding
 Tarnagulla Riding

Towns and localities

* Council seat.

Population

* Estimate in the 1958 Victorian Year Book.

See also
 Bet Bet Creek
 List of reduplicated Australian place names

References

External links
 Victorian Places - Bet Bet and Shire

Bet Bet
1861 establishments in Australia